Troncoso may refer to:

 Carlos Morales Troncoso (1940–2014), vice president of the Dominican Republic 1986–1994
 Carmela Troncoso (born 1982), Spanish telecommunication engineer, researcher and LGBT+ activist
 César Troncoso (born 1963), Uruguayan actor
 Enrique Troncoso Troncoso (1937–2018), Chilean Roman Catholic bishop
 Jorge Troncoso (born 1993), Chilean footballer
 Manuel de Jesús Troncoso de la Concha (1878–1955), intellectual and president of the Dominican Republic 1940–1942
 Martín Troncoso (born 1986), Argentine footballer
 Maruja Troncoso Ortega (born 1937), Spanish soprano and professor
 Patricio Troncoso (born 1993), Chilean footballer
 Ramón Troncoso (born 1983), Dominican baseball player
 Sergio Troncoso (born 1961), American author of short stories and novels